Ethmia perpulchra is a moth in the family Depressariidae. It is found from Veracruz in Mexico to Guatemala, Honduras and Costa Rica.

The ground color of the forewings is white. The ground color of the hindwings is shining translucent white, becoming pale brownish apically. Adults are on wing from February to May.

References

Moths described in 1912
perpulchra